The Anjouan white-eye (Zosterops anjuanensis) is a species of bird in the family Zosteropidae.

It is endemic to Anjouan of the Comoros.

Its natural habitat is subtropical or tropical moist lowland forest.

References

Zosterops
Birds described in 1877